The 79th annual Venice International Film Festival was held from 31 August to 10 September 2022.

Juries 
Main Competition (Venezia 79)
 Julianne Moore, American actress and author (Jury President)
 Mariano Cohn, Argentine director, screenwriter and producer
 Leonardo Di Costanzo, Italian director and screenwriter
 Audrey Diwan, French director and screenwriter
 Leila Hatami, Iranian actress
 Kazuo Ishiguro, British novelist and screenwriter
 Rodrigo Sorogoyen, Spanish director and screenwriter
Horizons (Orizzonti)
 Isabel Coixet (Jury President)
 Laura Bispuri
 Antonio Campos
 Sofia Djama
 
Luigi de Laurentiis Award
 Michelangelo Frammartino (Jury President)
 Jan P. Matuszyński
 Ana Rocha de Sousa
 Tessa Thompson
 Rosalie Varda
Venice Immersive
 May Abdalla (Jury President)
 David Adler
 Blanca Li

Official selections

In competition
The following films were selected for the main international competition:

Highlighted title indicates Golden Lion winner.

Out of competition
The following films were selected to be screened out of competition:

Horizons 
The lineup of films selected for the Horizons section is as follows:
{| class="sortable wikitable" style="width:95%; margin-bottom:2px"
! colspan=4| In competition
|-
! English title
! Original title
! Director(s)
! Production country
|-
| Princess  || || Roberto De Paolis || Italy
|-
| Victim || || Michal Blasko || Slovakia, Czech Republic, Germany
|-
| On the Fringe ||  || Juan Diego Botto || Spain
|-
| Trenque Lauquen || || Laura Citarella || Argentina, Germany
|-
| Vera || || Tizza Covi, Rainer Frimmel || Austria
|-
| Innocence  || || Guy Davidi  || Denmark, Israel, Finland, Iceland
|-
| Blanquita || ||   || Chile, Mexico
|-
| For My Country ||  ||   || France, Taiwan
|-
| A Man || ある男 || Kei Ishikawa || Japan
|-
| Bread and Salt ||  || Damian Kocur  || Poland
|-
| Luxembourg, Luxembourg || || Antonio Lukich || Ukraine
|-
| Burning Hearts || Ti mangio il cuore ||  || Italy
|-
| To the North || || Mihai Mincan || Romania, France, Greece, Bulgaria, Czech Republic
|-
| Autobiography || ||  || Indonesia, France, Singapore, The Philippines, Germany, Qatar
|-
| The Sitting Duck || La Syndicaliste || Jean-Paul Salomé || France
|-
|-style="background:#E7CD00;"
| World War III|| جنگ جهانی سوم|| Houman Seyyedi || Iran
|-
| The Happiest Man in the World || ||  || Bosnia, Belgium, Denmark
|-
| The Bride || || Sergio Trefaut || Portugal
|}
Highlighted title indicates Orizzonti award winner.

 Venice Immersive 
The lineup of films selected for the Venice Immersive section is as follows:

 Autonomous sections 

International Critics' Week
The lineup of films selected for the 37th International Critics' Week is as follows:

 Giornate degli Autori 

Awards

Official selection
The following official awards were presented at the 79th Edition:

In Competition
Golden Lion: All the Beauty and the Bloodshed by Laura Poitras
Grand Jury Prize: Saint Omer by Alice Diop
Silver Lion: Bones and All by Luca Guadagnino
Volpi Cup for Best Actress: Cate Blanchett for TárVolpi Cup for Best Actor: Colin Farrell for The Banshees of InisherinGolden Osella for Best Screenplay: The Banshees of Inisherin by Martin McDonagh
Special Jury Prize: No Bears by Jafar Panahi
Marcello Mastroianni Award: Taylor Russell for Bones and AllHorizons (Orizzonti)
 Best Film: World War III by Houman Seyyedi
 Best Director: Vera by Tizza Covi and Rainer Frimmel
 Special Jury Prize: Bread and Salt by Damian Kocur
 Best Actress: Vera Gemma for Vera Best Actor: Mohsen Tanabandeh for World War III Best Screenplay: Blanquita by Fernando Guzzoni
 Best Short Film: Snow in September by Lkhagvadulam Purev-Ochir

Horizons Extra
 Audience Award: Nezouh by Soudade Kaadan

Lion of the Future
 Luigi De Laurentiis Award for a Debut Film: Saint Omer by Alice Diop

Venice Immersive
 Best Experience: The Man Who Couldn't Leave by Chen Singing
 Grand Jury Prize: From the Main Square by Pedro Harres
 Special Jury Prize: Eggscape by German Heller

Autonomous sections
The following collateral awards were conferred to films of the autonomous sections:
 Grand Prize: Eismayer by David Wagner
 Jury special mention: Anhell69 by Theo Montoya
 The Film Club Audience award: Margini by Niccolò Falsetti
 Verona Film Club Award: Anhell69 by Theo Montoya
 Mario Serandrei: Anhell69 by Theo Montoya
 Best Short Film: Sapling by Lorenzo Fabbro and Bronte Stahl
 Best Director: Albertine Where Are You? by Maria Guidone
 Best Technical Contribution: Reginetta by Federico Russotto

Other collateral awards
The following collateral awards were conferred to films of the official selection:

 ARCA CinemaGiovani Award
 Best Film of Venezia 79: Athena by Romain Gavras
 Best Italian Film in Venice: Monica by Andrea Pallaoro
 Authors under 40 Award 
 Best Directing: Dogborn by Isabella Carbonell
 Best Directing: Ordinary Failures by Cristina Grosan
 Special Mention: The Last Queen by Adila Bendimerad and Damien Ounouri
 Special Mention: Have You Seen This Woman? by Dušan Zorić and Matija Gluščević
 Special Mention: Blue Jean by Georgia Oakley
 Brain Award: Lord of the Ants by Gianni Amelio
 Casa Wabi – Mantarraya Award: Saint Omer by Alice Diop
 CICT - UNESCO "Enrico Fulchignoni" Award: Nuclear by Oliver Stone
 Cinema & Arts Award
 Golden Musa: Music for Black Pigeons by Jørgen Leth and Andreas Koefoed
 Golden Musa: Saint Omer by Alice Diop
 Premio CinemaSarà: The Whale by Darren Aronofsky
 Special Mention: No Bears by Jafar Panahi
 Edipo Re Award: Saint Omer by Alice Diop
 Premio Fondazione Fai Persona Lavoro Ambiente: The Sitting Duck by Jean-Paul Salomé
 Special Mention: Princess by Roberto De Paolis (treatment of issues related to environment)
 Special Mention: Hanging Gardens by Ahmed Yassin Al Daradji (treatment of issues related to work)
 Fanheart3 Award
 Graffetta d'Oro for Best Film: Don't Worry Darling by Olivia Wilde
 Nave d'Argento for Best OTP: to the characters Charles Eismayer and Mario Falak in Eismayer by David Wagner
 XR Fan Experience: Lustration by Ryan Griffen
 XR Special Mention: Fight Back by Celine Tricart
 FEDIC Award: Gli ultimi giorni dell'umanità by Enrico Ghezzi and Alessandro Gagliardo
 Special Mention for Best Film: Burning Hearts by Pippo Mezzapesa
 Special Mention for Best Short Film: Albertine Where Are You? by Maria Guidone
 FIPRESCI Awards:
 Best Film (main competition): Argentina, 1985 by Santiago Mitre
 Best Film (other sections): Autobiography by Makbul Mubarak
 Francesco Pasinetti Award: Dry by Paolo Virzì
 Europa Cinemas Label Award: Dirty, Difficult, Dangerous by Wissam Charaf
 GdA Director's Award: Wolf and Dog by Cláudia Varejão
 People Choice's Award (Giornate degli Autori): Blue Jean by Georgia Oakley
 BNL Gruppo BNP Paribas People's Choice Award (Giornate degli Autori): The Maiden by Graham Foy
 Green Drop Award: White Noise by Noah Baumbach
 Special Mention: Dry by Paolo Virzì
 10th INTERFILM Award for Promoting Interreligious Dialogue: The Whale by Darren Aronofsky
 Lanterna Magica Award: Nezouh by Soudade Kaadan
 Leoncino d'Oro Award: The Whale by Darren Aronofsky
 Cinema for UNICEF: Athena by Romain Gavras
 Lizzani Award: Chiara by Susanna Nicchiarelli
 Special Mention: A Guerra Finita by Simone Massi
 NUOVOIMAIE TALENT AWARD
 Best New Young Actor: Leonardo Maltese for Lord of the Ants Best New Young Actress: Margherita Mazzucco for Chiara La Pellicola d'Oro Award
 Best Production Director: Barbara Busso for Lord of the Ants Best Camera Operator: Cesare Pascarella for Lord of the Ants Best Costume Tailoring: Laura Montaldi for Chiara Queer Lion: Skin Deep by Alex Schaad
 RB Casting Award: Leonardo Maltese for Lord of the Ants SIGNIS Award: Chiara by Susanna Nicchiarelli
 Special Mention: Argentina, 1985 by Santiago Mitre
 Smithers Foundation Award "Ambassador of Hope": All the Beauty and the Bloodshed by Laura Poitras
 “Sorriso Diverso Venezia Award” XI edition
 Best Italian Film: Chiara by Susanna Nicchiarelli
 Best Foreign Film: The Whale by Darren Aronofsky
 Premio Soundtrack Stars Award
 Best Soundtrack: Dry, soundtrack by Franco Piersanti
 Lifetime Achievement Award: Stefano Bollani
 Special Mention: Sergio Leone: The Italian Who Invented America, soundtrack by Rodrigo D'Erasmo 
 Premio UNIMED: Bardo, False Chronicle of a Handful of Truths'' by Alejandro González Iñárritu

Special awards 
Golden Lion For Lifetime Achievement: Paul Schrader and Catherine Deneuve

References

External links
 

2022 film festivals
2022 in Italian cinema
79
Film